The German Architecture Museum (DAM) is located on the Museumsufer in Frankfurt, Germany. Housed in an 18th-century building, the interior has been re-designed by Oswald Mathias Ungers in 1984 as a set of "elemental Platonic buildings within elemental Platonic buildings".  It houses a permanent exhibition entitled "From Ancient Huts to Skyscrapers" which displays the history of architectural development in Germany.

The museum organises several temporary exhibitions every year, as well as conferences, symposia and lectures. It has a collection of ca. 180,000 architectural drawings and 600 models, including works by modern and contemporary classics like Erich Mendelsohn, Mies van der Rohe, Archigram and Frank O. Gehry. It also includes a reference library with approximately 25,000 books and magazines.

Awards
The DAM grants several awards:
DAM Preis für Architektur in Deutschland
International Highrise Award
DAM Architectural Book Award
Europäischer Architekturfotografiepreis
European Prize for Urban Public Space

Museumsufer 
German Architecture Museum is part of the Museumsufer.

See also 
 Museumsufer

References

External links

 
 

Museums in Frankfurt
Architecture museums in Germany
Architecture in Germany